Eskimology  or Inuitology is a complex of humanities and sciences studying the languages, history, literature, folklore, culture, and ethnology of the speakers of Eskimo–Aleut languages and Inuit, Yupik and Aleut (or Unangam), sometimes collectively known as Eskimos, in historical and comparative context. This includes ethnic groups from the Chukchi Peninsula on the far eastern tip of Siberia in Russia, through Alaska of the United States, Canada's Inuit Nunangat, including the Inuvialuit Settlement Region, Nunavut Nunavik and Nunatsiavut, through NunatuKavut (but not the Gulf of St. Lawrence area), to Greenland of Denmark. Originally, an Eskimologist or Inuitologist was primarily a linguist or philologist who researches Eskimo or Inuit languages.

History
Eskimology traces its beginning to the pioneering work of Hans Egede (1745) and David Crantz (1767) in Greenland. Eskimology has traditionally had a particular focus on Greenland studies owing to the long-standing relationship between Denmark and Greenland established in the early 18th century, and the academic discipline of Eskimology is today centered at the University of Copenhagen. The term "Eskimology" was not common until 1967, when a genuine department was established and officially named the Department of Eskimology. From the late 1960s, Eskimology changed its focus toward increasingly contemporary and global political issues. In 2019, the department changed its name to Greenlandic and Arctic Studies Section (a section within the Department of Cross-cultural and Regional Studies). Greenlandic and Arctic Studies Section offers full BA and MA programmes. In these programmes, the study of the Greenlandic language and the socio-cultural issues of Greenland / Arctic are central.

List of Eskimologists  
 Knut Bergsland
 Ann Fienup-Riordan
 Michael Fortescue
 Sven Haakanson
 Erik Holtved
 Steven A. Jocobson
 Lawrence D. Kaplan
 Michael E. Krauss
 Margaret Lantis
 Jeff Leer
 Edna Ahgeak MacLean
 
 Osihito Miyaoka
 Wendell H. Oswalt
 Knud Rasmussen "father of Eskimology"
 Jørgen Rischel
 Jerrold Sadock
 Wolf Seiler
 William Thalbitzer
 James W. VanStone

See also
 Inuit Tapiriit Kanatami ("Inuit United with Canada")
 Alaska Native Language Center

References

External links 
Eskimology and Arctic Studies

Eskimology
Eskaleut languages
Area studies